Charles John "Doc" Watson (January 30, 1885, in Carroll County, Ohio – December 30, 1949 in San Diego, California) was a pitcher in Major League Baseball.

External links

Major League Baseball pitchers
Chicago Cubs players
Chicago Whales players
St. Louis Terriers players
La Crosse Pinks players
La Crosse Outcats players
Milwaukee Brewers (minor league) players
Houston Buffaloes players
Shreveport Gassers players
Saskatoon Quakers (baseball) players
Edmonton Elks players
Baseball players from Ohio
People from Carroll County, Ohio
1880s births
1949 deaths